Psilogramma gerstmeieri is a moth of the  family Sphingidae. It is known from Guangdong, China.

References

Psilogramma
Moths described in 2001
Endemic fauna of China